Brown's pademelon (Thylogale browni) is a species of marsupial in the family Macropodidae. It is found in New Guinea. Its natural habitats are subtropical or tropical dry forests, dry savanna, subtropical or tropical dry shrubland, and subtropical or tropical dry lowland grassland. It is threatened by habitat loss.

References

Macropods
Marsupials of New Guinea
Mammals of Western New Guinea
Mammals of Papua New Guinea
Mammals described in 1877
Taxa named by Edward Pierson Ramsay
Taxonomy articles created by Polbot